The Iranian football champions are the winners of the highest league in Iranian football, which since 2001–02 is the Pro League.  The title has been contested since 1970, in varying forms of competition.  While Persepolis has won a record 14 championship titles.

Champions

Local League (1970–72)

Takht Jamshid Cup (1973–78)

Qods League (1989–1990)

Azadegan League (1991–2001)

Iran Pro League (2001–)

Bold indicates Double winners – i.e. League and Hazfi Cup winners OR League and Champions League winners
Italic indicates Treble winners – i.e. League, Hazfi Cup and Champions League winners

Notes
 No national championships were held in 1972–73, between 1979–89 (due to the Iranian Revolution and the Iran–Iraq War), or in 1990–91 (due to fixture congestion with the national team's competitions).

Performances

Clubs
The following table lists the performance of each club describing winners of the Championship.
 source:

Total titles won by city
The following table lists the Iranian football champions by  city.

Total titles won by province
The following table lists the Iranian football champions by Province.

 Since 2003 to 2015, Saipa Club had played its games in Karaj (Capital of Alborz Province). but before the formation of the Alborz province in 2010, Karaj was considered part of the Tehran province in Iran's divisions.

See also
 Football in Iran
 Iranian football league system
 Hazfi cup

Notes

References 

List at RSSSF

External links

Iran
Football leagues in Iran
Takht Jamshid Cup
Azadegan League
Persian Gulf Pro League